Cerebrovascular Diseases is a peer-reviewed medical journal covering the study of cerebrovascular diseases. It was established in 1991 by Michael G. Hennerici and Julien Bogousslavsky, and is published eight times per year by Karger Publishers. Hennerici is the journal's editor-in-chief. According to the Journal Citation Reports, the journal has a 2016 impact factor of 2.974.

References

External links

Karger academic journals
Publications established in 1991
Cardiology journals
English-language journals